The Attorney-General of the Northern Territory, in formal contexts also Attorney-General or Attorney General for the Northern Territory, is the primary Law Officer of the Crown in the Northern Territory. The Attorney General serves as the chief legal and constitutional adviser of the Government of the Northern Territory and administers their portfolio through the Department of the Attorney-General and Justice.

Chansey Paech is the current Attorney-General, having been sworn in on 23 May 2022.

List of Northern Territory Attorneys-General

See also

 Government of Northern Territory
 Justice ministry

References

External links

Northern Territory Government. Department of the Attorney-General and Justice

 
Northern Territory-related lists
Australian Capital Territory
Ministers of the Northern Territory government